Oxy may refer to:

Arts, entertainment, and media
 Oxy, a fictional character from the Molecularium Project
 Oxy, abbreviation for the Oxyrhynchus Papyri

Brands and enterprises
 Oxy, a line of skin care products from Mentholatum
 OXY, Ticker symbol and nickname for Occidental Petroleum
 Oxy, a brand of cleaning products from Reckitt Benckiser

Other uses
 Oxy or oxo, a ketone functional group
 Oxy, nickname for Occidental College
 Oxy, short for oxy-fuel welding and cutting
 Oxy, slang term for the drug oxycodone
 Oxy, nickname for the USATF Distance Classic
 OXY, the product code for the Game Boy Micro, a reference to its development codename of "Oxygen"

See also
 Oxi, a stimulant drug based on cocaine paste